GlobalFoundries Inc. (GF or GloFo) is a multinational semiconductor contract manufacturing and design company incorporated in the Cayman Islands and headquartered in Malta, New York. Created by the divestiture of the manufacturing arm of AMD, the company was privately owned by Mubadala Investment Company, the sovereign wealth fund of the United Arab Emirates, until an initial public offering (IPO) in October 2021.

The company manufactures integrated circuits on wafers designed for markets such as mobility, automotive, computing and wired connectivity, consumer internet of things (IoT) and other industrial applications.

As of 2021, GlobalFoundries is the fourth-largest semiconductor manufacturer; it produces chips for more than 7% of the $86 billion semiconductor manufacturing services industry. It is the only one with operations in Singapore, the European Union, and the United States: one 200 mm and one 300 mm wafer fabrication plant in Singapore; one 300 mm plant in Dresden, Germany; one 200 mm plant in Burlington, Vermont (where it is the largest private employer) and two 300 mm plants in the State of New York: one in East Fishkill and one in Malta.

GlobalFoundries is a "Trusted Foundry" for the U.S. federal government and has similar designations in Singapore and Germany, including certified international Common Criteria standard (ISO 15408, CC Version 3.1).

On October 28, 2021, the company sold shares in an IPO on the Nasdaq stock exchange at US$47 each, at the higher end of its targeted price range, and raised about US$2.6 billion.

Overview
On October 7, 2008, AMD announced it planned to go fabless and spin off their semiconductor manufacturing business into a new company temporarily called The Foundry Company. Mubadala announced their subsidiary Advanced Technology Investment Company (ATIC) agreed to pay $700 million to increase their stake in AMD's semiconductor manufacturing business to 55.6% (up from 8.1%). Mubadala will invest $314 million for 58 million new shares, increasing their stake in AMD to 19.3%. $1.2 billion of AMD's debt will be transferred to The Foundry Company. On 8 December 2008, amendments were announced. AMD will own approximately 34.2% and ATIC will own approximately 65.8% of The Foundry Company.

On March 4, 2009, GlobalFoundries was officially announced. On September 7, 2009, ATIC announced it would acquire Chartered Semiconductor for S$2.5 billion (US$1.8 billion) and integrate Chartered Semiconductor into GlobalFoundries. On January 13, 2010, GlobalFoundries announced it had finalized the integration of Chartered Semiconductor.

On March 4, 2012, AMD announced they divested their final 14% stake in the company, which concluded AMD's multi-year plan to divest its manufacturing arm.

On October 20, 2014, IBM announced the sale of its microelectronics business to GlobalFoundries.

As of 2015, the firm owned ten fabrication plants. Fab 1 is in Dresden, Germany. Fabs 2 through 7 are in Singapore. Fabs 8 through 10 are in the northeast United States. These sites are supported by a global network of R&D, design enablement, and customer support in Singapore, China, Taiwan, Japan, India, the United States, Germany, and the United Kingdom. In February 2017, the company announced a new 300 Fab [Fab 11] in China for growing semiconductor market in China.

In 2016, GlobalFoundries licensed the 14 nm 14LPP FinFET process from Samsung Electronics. In 2018, GlobalFoundries developed the 12 nm 12LP node based on Samsung's 14nm 14LPP process.

On August 27, 2018, GlobalFoundries announced it had cancelled their 7LP process due to a strategy shift to focus on specialized processes instead of leading edge performance.

On January 29, 2019, AMD announced an amended wafer supply agreement with GlobalFoundries. AMD now has full flexibility for wafer purchases from any foundry at 7 nm or beyond. AMD and GlobalFoundries agreed to commitments and pricing at 12 nm for 2019 through 2021.

On May 20, 2019, Marvell Technology Group announced it would acquire Avera Semi from GlobalFoundries for $650 million and potentially an additional $90 million. Avera Semi was GlobalFoundries' ASIC Solutions division, which had been a part of IBM's semiconductor manufacturing business. On February 1, 2019, GlobalFoundries announced the $236 million sale of its Fab 3E in Tampines, Singapore, to Vanguard International Semiconductor (VIS) as part of their plan to exit the MEMS business by December 31, 2019. on April 22, 2019, GlobalFoundries announced the $430 million sale of their Fab 10 in East Fishkill, New York, to ON Semiconductor. GlobalFoundries has received $100 million and will receive $330 million at the end of 2022 when ON Semiconductor will gain full operational control. The 300mm fab is capable of 65 nm to 40 nm and was a part of IBM. On August 15, 2019, GlobalFoundries announced a multi-year supply agreement with Toppan Photomasks. The agreement included Toppan acquiring GlobalFoundries' Burlington photomask facility.

In February 2020, GlobalFoundries announced that its embedded magnetoresistive non-volatile memory (eMRAM) entered production which is the industry's first production ready eMRAM.

In May 2020, GlobalFoundries stated it was fully abandoning its plans of opening Fab 11 in Chengdu, China due to reported rivalry between the latter and the US. This was three years after the manufacturer announced it would invest $10 billion to open the new fab; the fab was never brought online.

On April 26, 2021, GlobalFoundries announced that effective immediately, it was transferring its global headquarters from Santa Clara, California to its Malta, New York campus (home to Fab 8).

In August 2022, Google expanded its open-source chip design and manufacturing efforts by partnering with GlobalFoundries to develop an open-source process design kit (PDK) based on the foundry's 180nm node. In October 31, Google announced they would sponsor no-cost OpenMPW (multi-project wafer) shuttle runs for it in the coming months.

In February 2023, GlobalFoundries signed a deal to become the exclusive provider of US-produced semiconductor chips for GM amid an ongoing shift to electric vehicles in what was referred to as an "industry-first" deal. It would help GM reduce the amount of different chips needed in its vehicles. The companies planned for production in Malta, New York. The deal would not lead to new jobs right away but would rather ensure stability in the supply of chips. At the time of the announcement, GlobalFoundries CEO Thomas Caufield said the full effect of this increase in production would be seen in two to three years.

GlobalFoundries v. TSMC et al (2019) 
On August 26, 2019, GlobalFoundries filed patent infringement lawsuits against TSMC and some of TSMC's customers in the US and Germany. GlobalFoundries claims TSMC's 7 nm, 10 nm, 12 nm, 16 nm, and 28 nm nodes have infringed on 16 of its patents. Lawsuits were filed in the U.S. International Trade Commission, the U.S. Federal District Courts in the Districts of Delaware, the Western District of Texas, the Regional Courts  of Düsseldorf, and Mannheim in Germany. GlobalFoundries has named 20 defendants: Apple, Broadcom, MediaTek, Nvidia, Qualcomm, Xilinx, Arista, ASUS, BLU, Cisco, Google, Hisense, Lenovo, Motorola, TCL, OnePlus, Avnet/EBV, Digi-Key and Mouser. On August 27, TSMC announced it was reviewing the complaints filed, but are confident that the allegations are baseless and will vigorously defend its proprietary technology.

On October 1, 2019, TSMC filed patent infringement lawsuits against GlobalFoundries in the US, Germany and Singapore. TSMC claimed GlobalFoundries' 12 nm, 14 nm, 22 nm, 28 nm and 40 nm nodes have infringed on 25 of its patents.

On October 29, 2019, TSMC and GlobalFoundries announced a resolution to the dispute. The companies agreed to a new life-of-patents cross-license for all of their existing semiconductor patents as well as new patents to be filed by the companies in the next ten years.

List of GlobalFoundries CEOs 

 Doug Grose (2009–2011)
 Ajit Manocha (2011–2014)
 Sanjay Jha (2014–2018)
 Tom Caulfield (2018–present)

Fabrication foundries in operation

300 mm fabrication facilities

Fab 1
Fab 1, located in Dresden, Germany, is a 364,512 m2 plant which was transferred to GlobalFoundries on its inception: Fab 36 and Fab 38 were renamed Module 1 and Module 2, respectively. Each module can produce 25,000 300 mm diameter wafers per month.

Module 1 is a 300 mm wafer production facility. It is capable of manufacturing wafers at 40 nm, 28 nm BULK and 22 nm FDSOI. Module 2 was originally named "(AMD) Fab 30" and was a 200 mm fab producing 30,000 Wafer Outs Per Month, but has now been converted into a 300 mm wafer fab. Together with other clean room extensions like the Annex they have a maximum full capacity of 80,000 of 300 mm wafers/month. (180,000 200 mm wafers/month equivalent), using technologies of 45 nm and below.

In September 2016, GlobalFoundries announced Fab 1 would be refit to produce 12 nm fully depleted silicon on insulator (FDSOI) products. The company expected customer's products would begin to tape out in the first half of 2019.

Fab 7
Fab 7, located in Woodlands, Singapore, is an operational 300 mm Fab, originally owned by Chartered Semiconductor. It produces wafers at 130 nm to 40 nm on bulk CMOS and SOI processes. It has a maximum full capacity of 50,000 300 mm wafers/month (112,500 200 mm wafers/month equivalent), using 130 to 40 nm technology.

4/15/2021 Fab 7's target capacity will be expanded to 70–80kpcs/M.

Fab 8
Fab 8, located in Luther Forest Technology Campus, Saratoga County, New York, United States is a 300 mm fab. This fabrication plant was constructed by GF as a green field fab for advanced technologies. It is capable of manufacturing 14 nm node technology. The plant's construction began in July 2009 and the company started mass production in 2012. It has a maximum manufacturing capacity of 60,000 of 300 mm wafers/month, or the equivalent of over 135,000 of 200 mm wafers/month. In September 2016, GlobalFoundries announced it would make a multibillion-dollar investment to refit Fab 8 to produce 7 nm FinFET parts starting in the second half of 2018. The process was planned to initially use deep ultraviolet lithography, and eventually transition to extreme ultraviolet lithography.

However, in August 2018, GlobalFoundries made the decision to suspend 7 nm development and planned production, citing the unaffordable costs to outfit Fab 8 for 7 nm production. GlobalFoundries held open the possibility of resuming 7 nm operations in the future if additional resources could be secured. From this decision GlobalFoundries executed a shift in company strategy to focus more effort on FD-SOI manufacturing and R&D. Fab 8 serves a crucial function to supply AMD (Advanced Micro Devices) with CPU Wafers for its Zen line of microprocessors used in the Ryzen, Threadripper and Epyc lines of CPUs. The original Zen and the Zen+ CPUs are of a monolithic design which were produced at Global Foundries Malta Facilities in Malta, NY. Going forward AMD will pursue a multiple Chiplet Design with the Zen 2 microprocessor. The Zen 2 will consist of a 14/12 nm manufactured IO die surrounded by a number of 7 nm Core dies. When Global Foundries announced the suspension of 7 nm operations AMD executed a shift in plans transferring production of the 7 nm core dies to TSMC (Taiwan Semiconductor Corporation). There was speculation in some quarters as to where manufacture of the Core Dies would take place. In AMD's 2018 fourth quarter financial conference call which took place on January 29, 2019, AMD CEO Lisa Su announced the WSA (Wafer Supply Agreement) governing production and acquisition by AMD from GlobalFoundries had been amended for the seventh time. The amendment stated AMD would continue to procure 12 nm node and above from Global Foundries while giving AMD latitude to purchase 7 nm node manufactured wafers from any source free from paying any royalties. The agreement will run through 2024 and ensures that Global Foundries will have work for its Malta plant for that time period. Pricing commitments for Wafers runs through 2021 when it is likely the WSA will be amended again.

Fab 10
Fab 10, located in East Fishkill, New York, United States, was previously known as IBM Building 323. It became part of GlobalFoundries operations with the acquisition of IBM Microelectronics. It currently manufactures technology down to the 14 nm node. In April 2019, it was announced that this fab has been sold to ON Semiconductor for $430m. The facility will be transferred over within three years.

200 mm fabrication facilities
All 200 mm fabs except Fab 9 are located in Singapore, and originally owned by Chartered Semiconductor.

Fab 2
Fab 2, located in Woodlands, Singapore. This fab is capable of manufacturing wafers at 600 to 350 nm for use in selected automotive IC products, High Voltage power management IC and Mixed-signal products.

Fab 3/5
Fab 3/5, located in Woodlands, Singapore. This fab is capable of manufacturing wafers at 350 to 180 nm for use in high voltage IC's for small panel display drivers and mobile power management modules.

Fab 3E
Fab 3E, located in Tampines, Singapore. This fab produces 180 nm wafers for use in selected automotive IC products, High Voltage power management IC and Mixed-Signal products with embedded non-volatile memory technology.

In January 2019 GlobalFoundries announced that it had agreed to sell its Fab 3E in Singapore to Vanguard International Semiconductor Corporation with transfer of ownership set to be completed on December 31, 2019.

Fab 6
Fab 6 located in Woodlands, Singapore, is a copper fabrication facility that is capable of manufacturing integrated CMOS and RFCMOS products for applications such as Wi-Fi & Bluetooth devices at 180 to 110 nm processes. The facility was later converted to 300mm and merged with Fab 7, a facility for manufacturing products based on the 300 nm node.

Fab 9
Fab 9, located in the village of Essex Junction, Vermont, United States, near Vermont's largest city of Burlington, became part of GlobalFoundries operations with the acquisition of IBM Microelectronics. The fab manufactures technologies down to the 90 nm node and is the largest private employer within the state of Vermont. The site also hosted a captive mask shop, with development efforts down to the 7 nanometer node, until it was sold to Toppan in 2019.

Mergers and acquisitions

Chartered Semiconductor
The majority investor of GlobalFoundries, Abu Dhabi's Advanced Technology Investment Co., announced on September 6, 2009, that it has agreed to acquire Singapore-based Chartered Semiconductor Manufacturing Co. Ltd., for a total of $3.9 billion, with Chartered's operations being folded into GlobalFoundries.

Chartered Semiconductor is a member of the Common Platform, IBM's semiconductor technology alliance. GlobalFoundries is a JDA partner of Common Platform Technology Alliance.

IBM Microelectronics

In October 2014, GlobalFoundries received US$1.5 billion from IBM to accept taking over IBM Microelectronics, including a 200 mm fab (now Fab 9) in Essex Junction, Vermont, and a 300 mm fab (now Fab 10) in East Fishkill, New York. As part of the agreement, GlobalFoundries will be the sole provider of IBM's server processor chips for the next 10 years. The deal closed on July 1, 2015. IBM-India employees who moved over to GlobalFoundries as part of the acquisition are now part of its Bangalore office.

In April 2019 ON Semiconductor and GlobalFoundries announced a $430 million agreement to transfer ownership of GlobalFoundries 300mm Fab 10 in East Fishkill, New York, to ON Semiconductor.

Process technologies
GlobalFoundries' 22 nm FD-SOI process is second-sourced from STMicroelectronics. STMicroelectronics signed a sourcing and licensing agreement with Samsung for the same technology later.

GlobalFoundries' 14 nm 14LPP FinFET process is second-sourced from Samsung Electronics. GlobalFoundries' 12 nm FinFET nodes are based on Samsung's 14nm 14LPP process.

Number of processes currently listed here:

See also
 List of semiconductor fabrication plants

References

External links
 
 

 
2009 establishments in California
American companies established in 2009
Companies based in Saratoga County, New York
Semiconductor companies of the United States
Foundry semiconductor companies
Manufacturing companies based in New York (state)
Technology companies based in New York (state)
Electronics companies established in 2009
Sovereign wealth fund portfolio companies
Corporate spin-offs
2021 initial public offerings
Offshore companies of the Cayman Islands